The 1982 Argentina rugby union tour of France and Spain was a series of eight matches played by the Argentina national rugby union team in October and November 1982.

Matches

 Auvergne Seleccionado Regional: E.Bonebbal; L.Husson, T.Merlos, P, Rocacher, P.Bonal; P.Mathias, G.Ramon; M. Viatge P.Ruiz, J.P.Fauvel; J.J.Santos, D.Baby; Dales, Rizon: J. Brugiroux (P.Merocco),
Argentina: E, Sanguinetti; M, C ampo, R, Madero, M.Loffreda, J.Palma; H. Porta (capt.) .Soares Cache; T.Petersen, R, Da Vedla, E.Ure; A.lachetti, G.Traveglini; S.Dengra, A.Caurreges, P.Devoto. 

 Drome-Ardeche: Tourlonies; Anne, Mesny, Lacazak, Melonse; D.Camberabero, G.Camberabero; J.Rives (capt.), (Cecillon), Atcher, Buchet; Lorieux, Sales; Mareval, Fontbonne (Prox), Alabarbe.  Argentina: E.Sanguinetti; N.Campo, R.Madero, M.Loffreda, S.Varone; A. Soares Gache, H. Porta (capt.); T.Petersen, E.M.Ure, S.O' Connor: A.Ischetti, G.Travaglini; F.Moral, A.Courrages, P.Devoto. 

 French Army P.Tremouille; J.Bonnet, Lame E.Silva, P.Belín; (Otazo), J.M.Lescure, M.Mondar; T.Janeczeck, P.Roux, P.Dubois; G.Giraud, D.Defines; Lagrave, G.Tudela, Sauveterre.  Argentina:  M. Campo  J.Palma, R.Madero, M.Loffreda, O.Cappelleti; H.Porta, J.Miguens, M.M.Tezanos Pinto, R. De Vadia, S.O' Connor; G.Travaglini, G.Milano; S.Dengra, L. De Chazal, E. Rodriguez 

French Barbarians: M.Rase; Brunel, Merlos, Coderniu, Begú; Lescarboura, Vilquin; Lansaman, Nieucel, M.Mexted; Michel, Meleig; Stefanutti ; Dupont, Dubroce. Argentina:  E.Sanguinetti; M.Campo, R.Madero, M.Loffreda, G..Verano; H. Porta (capt.), J.Miguens; R. De Vedia, T.Petersen, E.M.Ure; A.Iachetti, G.Travaglini; S.Dengre, A.Courreges, P.Devoto.  

Poitou-Charente Desiré; Andrleu, Barboteau, Mothe, Lagisquet; Ch.Delego, Serrado; Gratton, Atcher, Fauvel; Guilleton, Mialot; Garat Bortolucci, Alabarbe Argentina: D.R.Baetti; J.Palma.M, Loffreda., M.Fijalkauskas, A.Cappellettl; G.Sanguinetti, J.Miguens; E.Ure, J. De Vedia, S.O' Connor: G.Travaglini, A.Iachetti; S.Dengra, L. De Chazal, E.Rodriguez.

Sources

Argentina national rugby union team tours
1982
1982
Argentina–Spain relations
Argentina–France relations
tour
tour